Clatsop Butte is an upland butte lying directly south of Powell Butte in southeast Portland, Oregon, United States. Johnson Creek, Southeast Foster Road, and the Springwater Corridor Trail pass between Powell Butte and Clatsop Butte near Southeast 152nd Avenue.

A 16-member oversight committee was to review the purchases in 2008 to decide whether the money had been wisely spent.

As of 2008, Metro the regional government in the Oregon part of the Portland metropolitan area, included  of the acreage on its list of protected natural areas. The natural area, comprising densely forested hillsides and creek frontage, supports wildlife including deer, foxes, coyotes, northern flickers, pileated woodpeckers and other local and migratory birds.

References

Buttes of Oregon
Mountains of Oregon
Geography of Portland, Oregon
Landforms of Multnomah County, Oregon
Parks in Portland, Oregon
Southeast Portland, Oregon
Protected areas established in 2000